Airton is the given name of:
Airton Andrioli (born 1965), Brazilian football coach
Airton Daré (born 1978), Brazilian race car driver
Airton (footballer, born 1994), full name Airton Moraes Michellon, Brazilian footballer
Airton Pavilhão (1934–2012), Brazilian footballer
Aírton Batista dos Santos (1942–1996), Brazilian footballer
Caíco (born 1974), full name Aírton Graciliano dos Santos, Brazilian retired footballer 
Airton José dos Santos (born 1956), Brazilian Roman Catholic archbishop
Airton (footballer, born February 1990), full name Airton Ribeiro Santos, Brazilian footballer 
Airton (footballer, born March 1990), Brazilian footballer Tirabassi
Airton (footballer, born 1999), full name Airton Moisés Santos Sousa, Brazilian footballer

See also
Ayrton